iNCOVACC (codenamed BBV154) is an intranasal COVID-19 vaccine candidate developed by Bharat Biotech, American company Precision Virologics and the  Washington University School of Medicine in St Louis, Missouri, United States.

History

Clinical trials

Phase I trials
On recommendation by the Subject Expert Committee (SEC) under the Indian drug regulator, the company is going to conduct phase 1 clinical trials using 75 volunteers and submit safety and immunogenicity data for the committee's consideration before it proceeds to the second phase of the trial.

Phase II and III trials
On 12 August 2021, after evaluating the results of phase I trial data, the drug regulator approved for phase II/III randomized trials that involves evaluation of the immunogenicity and safety of Covaxin with BBV154 in healthy volunteers.

Authorizations

India
On 24 December 2022, the Government of India approved the intranasal vaccine for inclusion in the vaccination programme as a booster dose for those above 18 years of age.

References

External links 

 Bharat Biotech's Intranasal Vaccine for COVID-19: Everything we know so far about BBV154 firstpost.com

Adenoviridae
Clinical trials
Indian COVID-19 vaccines
Viral vector vaccines